Mohammed Farashuddin is a Bangladeshi economist who served as the seventh Governor of Bangladesh Bank, the central bank of Bangladesh. He served during 1998–2001. He is the founder of East West University (EWU) where he was the founding vice-chancellor during 1995-1998. He is currently the chairperson of the board of trustees of the university. Farashuddin also served as the private secretary to Bangabandhu Sheikh Mujibur Rahman from 1973 to 1975.

Early life
Farash was born in the village of Ratanpur in Nayapara Union, Madhabpur, Habiganj District(The then undivided Sylhet)

References

Living people
Governors of Bangladesh Bank
20th-century Bangladeshi economists
Honorary Fellows of Bangla Academy
Murari Chand College alumni
1942 births
People from Habiganj District
21st-century Bangladeshi economists